Inchoatia inchoata is a species of air-breathing land snail, a terrestrial pulmonate gastropod mollusc in the family Clausiliidae, the door snails.

Description 
The shell is horny brown in color, weakly striated and shiny. The shell has 9-12 whorls with white suture, often papillated. The cervix is rounded. The aperture is U-shaped, inside yellowish brown. The apertural margin is white and not connected at parietal side. Parietalis is strong. Columellaris is with nodules and not very prominent. Lunula is lateral and ]-shaped. there is no basalis. Subcolumellaris is visible in the aperture.

The width of the shell is 2.3-2.8 mm. The height of the shell is 10–12 mm.

Distribution 

Inchoatia inchoata occurs in Epirus in Greece.

Subspecies
According to Gittenberger & Uit de Weerd (2009) the species Inchoatia haussknechti include 4 subspecies:

 Inchoatia inchoata inchoata (O. Boettger, 1889)
 Inchoatia inchoata klemmi (Nordsieck, 1972)
 Inchoatia inchoata paramythica (Nordsieck, 1974)
 Inchoatia inchoata regina (Nordsieck, 1972)

Inchoatia inchoata inchoata 
Synonyms include:
 Clausilia (Agathylla) inchoata O. Boettger, 1889
 Sericata (Sericata) inchoata inchoata
 Sericata inchoata
 Albinaria inchoata inchoata; Nordsieck, 2007: 44.

Diagnosis: The shell is hardly different from Inchoatia inchoata paramythica. Teleoconch is with prominent white papillae, continuing as blunt riblets in the background shell colour, on most of the whorls. Parietal side of the apertural border is not protruding. The lamella parietalis reaches the lamella spiralis or is shorter. The lamella columellaris is very low.

Range: This subspecies occurs in the mountains c. 20 km north of Preveza. The type locality is "Zalongo bei Libochovo", Greece, Ipiros, Preveza: Zalongo, 21 km NNW of Preveza, 200 m and 650–725 m alt.

Inchoatia inchoata klemmi
Synonyms include:
 Sericata (Sericata) inchoata klemmi Nordsieck, 1972
 Albinaria inchoata klemmi

Diagnosis: With some white papillae on the initial teleoconch whorls only, following whorls rather glossy, without any riblets. Parietal side of the apertural border is not protruding. Lamella columellaris is very low.

Range: This subspecies is only known from near Platanousa. The type locality is "Platanoussa bei Ioannina [650 m]".

Inchoatia inchoata paramythica
Synonyms include:
 Sericata (Sericata) inchoata paramythica Nordsieck, 1974
 Albinaria inchoata paramythica

This is by far the most common subspecies in Inchoatia.

Diagnosis: The shell is hardly different from Inchoatia inchoata inchoata. Teleoconch with prominent white papillae, continuing as blunt riblets, sometimes whitened but more often in the background shell colour, on most of the whorls. Parietal side of the apertural border is not protruding. Lamella parietalis is reaching beyond the end of the lamella spiralis. Lamella columellaris very low.

Range: Inchoatia inchoata paramythica is known from several localities at relatively low altitudes in Mt Paramithias and the adjoining mountain chains to the north and to the south. The type locality is "Gliki 4 km Richtung Frosini".

Inchoatia inchoata regina
Synonyms include:
 Sericata (Sericata) regina Nordsieck, 1972
 Sericata regina
 Albinaria regina

Diagnosis: Teleoconch is with some white papillae on the initial whorls only, following whorls rather glossy, without any riblets. Parietal side of the apertural border is protruding. Lamella columellaris is somewhat protruding into the aperture.

Range: The type locality is "Louros-Durchbruch nahe Ay. Yeoryios bei Arta", Louros gorge (of the Louros river) near Ay. Yeoryios.

References
This article incorporates CC-BY-3.0 text from reference and public domain text from the reference.

External links 

Clausiliidae
Endemic fauna of Greece
Gastropods described in 1889
Epirus (region)